Telugabbai (English translation - Telugu boy) is a 2013 Telugu film written and directed by OS Avinash. The film stars Tanish, Remya and Tashu Kaushik. The story is set between two Telugu families who migrated to Malaysia long ago, says the director. The movie has been shot completely in Malaysia. This was the first Telugu film to be shot completely in Malaysia. Mejo Joseph composed the music of the movie. The film was titled Salamath first.

Cast
 Tanish as Arun
 Remya Nambeeshan as Chandamaama
 Tashu Kaushik as Megha
 Nagababu
 Lohith
 Sona Nair
 Ananyya

Soundtrack

Malayalam music director, Mejo Joseph has scored the music for the film. Legendary music director S. P. Kodandapani's son S. P. Eswar has given the background score. Minmini, who had sung the song "Chinni Chinni Aasa" in "Roja", has sung the songs "Kila Kila Mani" and "Chithramga Undhe" in this film. Ramya Nambeesan has sung the song "Pudamini Mose Puvva".

Reception 
A critic from 123telugu said that "On the whole, Telugabbai is one film which has everything going against it right from the word go. Outdated story, routine dialogues and some very bad direction make the film go haywire".

References

2013 films
2010s Telugu-language films
Films shot in Malaysia